Early may refer to:

History
 The beginning or oldest part of a defined historical period, as opposed to middle or late periods, e.g.:
 Early Christianity
 Early modern Europe

Places in the United States
 Early, Iowa
 Early, Texas
 Early Branch, a stream in Missouri
 Early County, Georgia

Other uses
 Early (Scritti Politti album), 2005
 Early (A Certain Ratio album), 2002
 Early (name)
 Early effect, an effect in transistor physics
 Early Records, a record label
 the early part of the morning

See also
 Earley (disambiguation)